Tai Wo Tsuen, sometimes transliterated as Tai Wor, is a village in Pat Heung, Yuen Long District, Hong Kong.

Administration
Tai Wor is a recognized village under the New Territories Small House Policy. Tai Wo Tsuen is one of the villages represented within the Pat Heung Rural Committee. For electoral purposes, Tai Wo Tsuen is part of the Pat Heung South constituency, which is currently represented by Lai Wing-tim.

References

External links

 Delineation of area of existing village Tai Wo Tsuen (Pat Heung) for election of resident representative (2019 to 2022)

Villages in Yuen Long District, Hong Kong
Pat Heung